St. Paul Historic District is a national historic district located at St. Paul, Wise County, Virginia. It contains 23 contributing buildings and 2 contributing structures in the central business district of St. Paul. Most contributing resources consist of commercial buildings dating from the 1920s to 1950s.  Notable buildings include the Ennis House (1887), Hillman/Ennis House (c. 1890), the old St. Paul Hotel (1901), National Bank building (c. 1900), Gaiety Movie Theater (1920s), The Lyric (c. 1950), and Cavalier Theater/ Phillips Building (c. 1955).

It was listed on the National Register of Historic Places in 2011.

References

Historic districts on the National Register of Historic Places in Virginia
Buildings and structures in Wise County, Virginia
National Register of Historic Places in Wise County, Virginia